The Holy Crown (Spanish: Reina santa) is a 1947 Spanish-Portuguese historical drama film starring Maruchi Fresno, Antonio Vilar and Luis Peña. Separate Spanish and Portuguese versions were filmed with the Spanish directed by Rafael Gil and the Portuguese by Henrique Campos and Aníbal Contreiras. It was part of a popular group of Spanish costume films made in the late 1940s.

The film portrays the life of Isabel of Aragon, a Spanish-born Queen of Portugal who played a role of peacemaker between different factions at the Portuguese court as well as between Portugal and Castile.

Cast

References

External links

1940s historical drama films
Spanish historical drama films
Portuguese historical drama films
1940s Spanish-language films
1940s Portuguese-language films
Films directed by Rafael Gil
Films set in Lisbon
Films set in the 13th century
Films set in the 14th century
Suevia Films films
Films produced by Cesáreo González
Spanish black-and-white films
Portuguese black-and-white films
1947 drama films
1940s multilingual films
Portuguese multilingual films
Spanish multilingual films
1940s Spanish films